Meymaneh Province was a former province of Afghanistan, which in 1964 was divided, creating Badghis Province and Faryab Province. However, the name "Maymana" survives the administrative center of the Faryab Province.

Sources
Statoids.com - Provinces of Afghanistan

Former provinces of Afghanistan
History of Badghis Province
History of Faryab Province